Yeo Valley could refer to:

 the valley of the Congresbury Yeo
 the valley of any of the other River Yeos
 the company Yeo Valley Organic or the rap which features in its adverts